Ri Un-il (born 15 August 1998) is a North Korean footballer who currently plays as a midfielder for Kigwancha SC.

Career statistics

International

References

External links
 

1998 births
Living people
North Korean footballers
North Korea international footballers
Association football midfielders